This is a list of the events held by Japanese mixed martial arts (MMA) promotion Smackgirl.

Events

Remix

Smackgirl

Smackgirl-F

Grappling events

Notes

References

External links 
Smackgirl events at Sherdog

Japan sport-related lists
Mixed martial arts events lists
Women's sport-related lists
Women's mixed martial arts